Rumpelstiltskin is a 1995 American fantasy horror comedy film directed by Mark Jones and starring Max Grodénchik as the title character.

Plot
In the 15th century, Rumpelstiltskin is imprisoned inside a small jade figurine. In modern-day Los Angeles, the recently widowed wife of a police officer, with baby in tow, finds her way into a witch's shop and purchases a certain figurine, resulting in the cackling beast being freed and demanding possession of the baby.

Cast
Kim Johnston Ulrich as Shelly Stewart
Tommy Blaze as Max Bergman
Allyce Beasley as Hildy
Max Grodénchik as Rumpelstiltskin
Vera Lockwood as Matilda
Jay Pickett as Russell Stewart
Sherman Augustus as John McCabe
Valerie Wildman as Nedda
Jack McGee as Detective Ben Smith
Mark Holton as Huge Man
Elmarie Wendel as Gypsy Woman

Release
Rumpelstiltskin was not a success at the box office, it made only $306,494, with its widest release being 54 theaters. The film was released on DVD on August 21, 2001, by Republic Pictures. The film was released on DVD on January 10, 2004, by Lionsgate Home Entertainment

Critical response

AllMovie wrote, "this groan-inducing would-be camp [...] boasts some good makeup by Kevin Yagher but is still easily the worst of the '90s crop of fairy-tale horrors." JoBlo.com's Arrow in the Head reviewed the movie in 2019, stating that "Listen, RUMPELSTILTSKIN is no award-winner, we all understand that. However, the movie is much better than the 10% box-office return it suffered on its already modest budget. It’s fast, fun, funny, gory, and knowingly pokes fun of itself as nothing more than a dark farcical fairytale."

Most reviews by the general public are polarized, both citing the film's absurdity as the deciding factor in their opinion. Fans of the movie would say that Rumpelstiltskin is a prime example of the "movies so bad that they're actually good" genre.

References

External links

 

1995 films
1995 horror films
American supernatural horror films
Films scored by Charles Bernstein
Films set in Los Angeles
Films based on Rumpelstiltskin
1990s comedy horror films
1995 comedy films
1990s English-language films
Films directed by Mark Jones
1990s American films
Horror films based on children's franchises